Countess Palatine Anna Maria of Neuburg (18 August 1575, Neuburg an der Donau – 11 February 1643, Dornburg) was Countess Palatine of Neuburg and by marriage Duchess of Saxe-Weimar.

Life 
Anna Maria was the eldest child of the Count Palatine and Duke Philip Louis of Neuburg (1547–1614) and Anna (1552–1632), daughter of Duke William of Jülich-Cleves-Berg.

She was married on 9 September 1591 in Neuburg to Duke Frederick William I of Saxe-Weimar (1562–1602).  On the occasion of the marriage, a medal was minted in gold, representing the couple, one on each side with a bust.  In 1604 she moved with her children from Weimar to Altenburg, which was separated from Weimar as an independent Duchy of Saxe-Altenburg for her sons.  After she was widowed in 1602, Anna Maria sank into deep sadness and from 1612, she lived separate from her children on her Wittum, the District and City of Dornburg.  During an attack on her Dornburg Castle by a Croatian force under General Tilly in 1631, during the Thirty Years' War, Anna Maria resisted the attackers but was robbed and wounded in the cheek.  With the help of citizens rushed to the scene, the attackers were averted.  Out of gratitude for this assistance, the Duchess donated a chalice to the local church.

Anna Maria died in 1643 and was buried in the brick royal crypt in the Brethren Church in Altenburg.

Issue 
From her marriage With Frederic William, Anna Maria had the following children:
 John Philip (1597–1639), Duke of Saxe-Altenburg
 married in 1618 princess Elisabeth of Brunswick-Wolfenbüttel (1593–1650)
 Anna Sophie (1598–1641)
 married in Duke in 1618 Charles Frederick I of Münsterberg-Oels (1593–1647)
 Frederick (1599–1625), Duke of Saxe-Altenburg
 John William (1600–1632), Duke of Saxe-Altenburg
 Dorothea (1601–1675)
 married in 1633 Duke Albert IV of Saxe-Eisenach (1599–1644)
 Frederick William II (1603–1669), Duke of Saxe-Altenburg
 married firstly in 1638 Princess Sophie Elisabeth of Brandenburg (1616–1650)
 married secondly, in 1652 Princess Magdalene Sibylle of Saxony (1617–1668)

References 
 Luise Hallof, Klaus Hallof: The inscriptions of the district Jena, Akademie Verlag, 1995, p. 159 ff.
 Association for Thuringian history and archeology, Jena: Journal of the Society for Thuringian History and Archaeology, Volume 6-7, G. Fischer, 1865, p. 248 ff.
 Johann Samuel Ersch: General Encyclopedia of the sciences and arts, Volume 50, J.f. Gleditsch, 1849, p. 81

External links 
 http://geneall.net/D/per_page.php?id=3483

Footnotes 

|-

House of Wittelsbach
German countesses
1575 births
1643 deaths
Duchesses of Saxe-Weimar
Countesses Palatine of Neuburg
Daughters of monarchs